Anonymous for the Voiceless (AV) is a grassroots animal rights organization specializing in street activism formed in April 2016, in Melbourne, Australia. Operating worldwide, Anonymous for the Voiceless now coordinate 100,000 volunteers in 591 AV chapters in 61 countries, with teams of volunteers organising and staging peaceful protest actions called 'Cubes of Truth'. These protests involve volunteers standing in a square formation wearing Guy Fawkes masks while holding screens showing footage of standard practice in the animal agriculture industry with the intention of empowering the public to support animal rights and be vegan.

It is not affiliated to the hacktivist group "Anonymous", despite the similarities of names and the use of the Guy Fawkes mask.

Cube of Truth 
The Cube of Truth is an outreach and education method in which a group of black-clad people wearing Guy Fawkes masks form a square facing outward while holding signs and video screens showing footage of inside slaughterhouses, farms, and vivisection labs. The cubes vary in size according to the number of  activists or space. Unmasked members of AV, known as "outreachers", talk to people onlooking and encourage adopting a vegan lifestyle. The AV activists offer a 22-day vegan challenge called "Challenge 22" to onlookers who decide they want to take the option of a vegan diet.

Campaigns 
The Melbourne group's actions began in April 2016, to be followed by a Sydney group from November.

On 5 November 2016, AV held 200 Cube of Truth actions across the world on the same day for the first of the now annual 'International Cube Day' campaigns.

Organization 
While it has been claimed that AV is a grassroots effort with no central organizing force beyond a website that links to each chapter and a series of Facebook groups that coordinate events, the organisation does have a small team which includes the Co-Founders and Directors. This team is responsible for coordinating volunteers globally, providing chapters with essential equipment and support, running activist training programmes, and delivering impactful online campaigns.

Anonymous for the Voiceless holds an abolitionist stance on animal exploitation.

Paul Bashir and Asal Alamdari founded the original group in Melbourne, although its headquarters are now in Chiang Mai, Thailand.

See also
List of animal rights groups

References

External links 

 

Animal rights organizations
Anti-vivisection organizations
Organizations established in 2016